Quincy Market is a historic building near Faneuil Hall in downtown Boston, Massachusetts. It was constructed between 1824 and 1826 and named in honor of mayor Josiah Quincy, who organized its construction without any tax or debt.  The market is a designated National Historic Landmark and a designated Boston Landmark in 1996, significant as one of the largest market complexes built in the United States in the first half of the 19th century. According to the National Park Service, some of Boston's early slave auctions took place near what is now Quincy Market.

As the central building of Faneuil Hall Marketplace, Quincy Market is often used metonymically for the entire development.  By the mid-20th century it was badly in need of repair, and it was redeveloped into a public shopping and restaurant area in the early 1970s and re-opened in 1976.  Today, this includes the original Quincy Market buildings, the later North Market and South Market buildings that flank the main Quincy Market, the historic Faneuil Hall lying at the west end, and two smaller curved buildings, added later to the eastern end.

History

By the time Boston was incorporated as a city in 1822, downtown commercial demand had grown beyond the capacity of Faneuil Hall. To provide an expansion of shop space Quincy Market was built, as an indoor pavilion of vendor stalls.

Designed by Alexander Parris, the main building was built immediately east of and "behind" Faneuil Hall which at the time sat next to the waterfront at the town dock. In an early example of Boston's tendency for territorial growth via landfill, part of the harbor was filled in with dirt to provide a plot of land for the market. The commercial growth spawned by the new marketplace led to the reconstruction or addition of six city streets.

From its beginning, the Market was largely used as a produce and foodstuff shopping center, with various grocers of such goods as eggs, cheese, and bread lining its inside walls. Digging performed for the expansion of the market in the late 1970s uncovered evidence of animal bones, suggesting that butchering work was done on-site. In addition, street vendors took up space outside the building in its plazas and against its outside walls. Some surviving signs of early food and supplies merchants hang today in the upstairs seating hall.

Design

Its exterior is largely granite, with red brick interior walls, and represents the first large-scale use of granite and glass in post-and-beam construction. Within, it employs innovative cast iron columns and iron tension rods. The east and west facades exhibit a strong Roman style, with strong triangular pediments and Doric columns. In contrast, the sides of the hall are more modern and American, with rows of rectangular windows.

The building's shape is a long rectangle, providing for a long hallway down its center line. On the roof are eight evenly spaced chimneys, and a copper-based dome in the center of the building, which covers an open common seating area and the major side entrances.

The main building is flanked on either side by -story brick and granite buildings, called the North Market and South Market.  Part of the market's original development, these buildings have been more extensively altered than the main building.  The entire complex was designated a National Historic Landmark and listed on the National Register of Historic Places in 1966. The central domed building was designated a Boston Landmark by the Boston Landmarks Commission in 1996. The North and South Market buildings are currently pending Boston Landmarks.

Faneuil Hall Marketplace 

In 1969, the department of Housing and Urban Development awarded the city of Boston approximately $2 million for market stabilization and restoration of roof lines and facades back to their 1826 appearance. The restoration project team included : Architectural Heritage Inc., Roger Webb; Stahl/Bennett Architects. Frederic A. Stahl, Principal in Charge; Roger Lang, Project Manager; James H. Ballou, Consulting Architect; and William LeMessurier, Structural Engineer.
By the early 1970s, Boston's meat and produce had moved to larger, more modern facilities and Quincy Market was decaying. Using a combination of public and private funds, architectural firm Benjamin Thompson and Associates and the developer Rouse Company developed a new building form, the festival marketplace.  The new Faneuil Hall Marketplace, incorporating Quincy Market, opened in 1976.  In 1977, it received the Harleston Parker Medal and in 2009, the AIA's Twenty-five Year Award.

The main Quincy Market building continues to be a source of food for Bostonians, though it has changed from grocery to food-stall, fast-food, and restaurants. It is a popular and busy lunchtime spot for downtown workers. In the center, surrounding the dome, is a two-story seating area.

Further street vending space is available against the outside walls of the building, especially on the south side, under a glass enclosure. Most stalls in this space sell trinkets, gifts, and other curiosities. A few restaurants also occupy fully enclosed spaces at the ends of this enclosure.

More conventional retail space is provided on the second floor and in the basement level. The Comedy Connection, one of Boston's two largest comedy clubs, only recently vacated one of the second-floor spaces, and bars and restaurants occupy space on the basement levels.

Flanking the main building in the marketplace are two equally long buildings (North Market and South Market) that expand the market space for more restaurants, specialty shops, and office spaces. Two further concave market buildings enclose a circular plaza at the market's east end.

The open spaces at both the east and west ends of the marketplace are a common venue for various street performers, as well as street vendors. Most daytime visits to Quincy Market will encounter a large circular crowd of people standing around a juggler or other act.

See also
 Festival marketplace
 The Rouse Company
 List of National Historic Landmarks in Boston
 National Register of Historic Places listings in northern Boston, Massachusetts

References

Further reading

 Semi-centennial celebration of the opening of Faneuil Hall Market, August 26, 1876: with a history of the market by Wm. W. Wheildon. L.F. Lawrence & Co., printers, 1877.

External links
Quincy Market
City of Boston - Boston Landmarks Commission
Quincy Market Study Report

1826 establishments in Massachusetts
Commercial buildings in Boston
Busking venues
Commercial buildings completed in 1826
Commercial buildings on the National Register of Historic Places in Massachusetts
Food markets in the United States
Government Center, Boston
Landmarks in Boston
National Historic Landmarks in Boston
National Register of Historic Places in Boston
Shopping malls in Massachusetts